Parsi Cola is a cola-flavoured soft drink produced in Iran. It is popular in parts of the Middle East. In Iran it is the main competitor to Zamzam Cola.

Cola brands
Iranian brands
Iranian drinks